Cyber Rights: Defending Free Speech in the Digital Age is a non-fiction book about cyberlaw, written by free speech lawyer Mike Godwin. It was first published in 1998 by Times Books. It was republished in 2003 as a revised edition by The MIT Press. Godwin graduated from the University of Texas School of Law in 1990 and was the first staff counsel for the Electronic Frontier Foundation. Written with a first-person perspective, Cyber Rights offers a background in the legal issues and history pertaining to free speech on the Internet. It documents the author's experiences in defending free speech online, and puts forth the thesis that "the remedy for the abuse of free speech is more speech". Godwin emphasizes that decisions made about the expression of ideas on the Internet affect freedom of speech in other media as well, as granted by the First Amendment to the United States Constitution.

The book was received favorably by Library Journal, where it was "Recommended for anyone concerned about expression on the Internet and democratic society." Publishers Weekly noted Godwin's "unusually broad view of free speech", and criticized the author for viewing issues "filtered through rose-colored screens". The Philadelphia Inquirer highlighted Cyber Rights among "1998's Best Reading".

Author 

Godwin is a graduate of the University of Texas School of Law. At the time of the book's first publication, Godwin was employed as a staff counsel at EFF. He had been hired as EFF's first staff counsel after graduating from law school in 1990. Law Library Journal noted, "In this position, he worked on the frontlines of the fight to make sure that freedom of expression is more than tolerated, that in fact it is able to flourish in cyberspace."

Cyber Rights: Defending Free Speech in the Digital Age is Godwin's first book. Godwin described himself as a civil libertarian. From 1997 to 1998, Godwin was a fellow of the Media Studies Center. In 2007, he took a research fellowship at Yale University. Godwin became general counsel for Wikimedia Foundation in July 2007.

Contents
Cyber Rights: Defending Free Speech in the Digital Age analyzes the legal issues involved with communicating on the Internet, including those relating to Internet privacy and government involvement. The book is written with a first-person perspective: the reader learns of the author's morning ritual, the fact that his cat is named Francie and that he married a woman he met through a Bulletin Board System. Godwin's motivation was to keep the Internet safe from government actions that restrict freedom of speech. He asserts that the First Amendment to the United States Constitution should apply equally to the Internet as it does to other media.

The book's early chapters ground the reader in principles involving cyberspace and the law. The author provides enough background that a layperson can understand the relevant legal history, including explaining libel and the extent to which copyrighted text may be quoted and used under the fair use principle. Godwin explains his goal is "to show that striking a balance in favor of individual rights has always been the right decision for us and that it remains so even when technology gives us new ways to exercise those rights. Individual liberty has never weakened us; freedom of speech, enhanced by the Net, will only make us stronger". He instructs the reader on how to become proficient in dealing with mainstream news media, writing, "Learn how to hack all the media. Then put that knowledge to good use".

Subsequent chapters consider traditional challenges to broad free speech in the online context, including: defamation, sexual harassment, copyright and issues involving privacy. He dismisses these issues as less important than freedom of speech. Godwin argues that individuals maintain latitude when communicating over the Internet because "it's far more likely that they'll do good than otherwise. This is because freedom of speech is itself a good. The framers of the Constitution were right to give it special protection, because societies in which people can speak freely are better off than societies in which they can't".

The author discusses influential legal cases including a judgment involving Compuserve, where the court ruled that the Internet service provider should be deemed similar to a bookstore avoiding liability for publishing potentially offensive speech. He recounts Steve Jackson Games, Inc. v. United States Secret Service which followed a raid by the United States Secret Service in 1990 on Steve Jackson Games and his involvement influencing the media relating to the incident. He cites the LaMacchia case, which dealt with charges of copyright infringement of software subsequently dismissed. An incident at Santa Rosa Junior College which involved issues of free speech and gender discrimination is discussed and analyzed in the book.

Godwin analyzes the effects of a 1995 cover story "Cyberporn" in Time magazine and writings by Martin Rimm that discussed the effect of Internet pornography. He explains how the theories presented in the article were discredited. Godwin calls the incident following the Time article the "cyber-porn panic"; noting how the magazine published a cover story on a purported pornography "study" and how he and others exposed flaws in the piece.

He cites the Communications Decency Act of 1996 (CDA) as an example of U.S. government action which cramps free speech. Godwin describes the subsequent attempts to defeat CDA. The Supreme Court of the United States held two sections to be unconstitutional and Godwin recounts how he became emotional over the decision. Throughout the book Godwin emphasizes that "the remedy for the abuse of free speech is more speech". Cyber Rights puts forth the notion that "virtual communities" can be fostered on the Internet that serve the values of democracy, writing "The decisions we make about the Internet don't affect just the Internet – they are answers to basic questions about the relationship each citizen has to the government and about the extent to which we trust one another with the full range of fundamental rights granted by the Constitution".

Reception
Cyber Rights: Defending Free Speech in the Digital Age was reviewed favorably in Library Journal, where it was described as "a provocative discussion of the social and legal issues concerning computer online communications". The review noted that Godwin, "provides an excellent background to the governmental and privacy dimensions of the Internet, using anecdotal accounts to illustrate web-related legal issues." Library Journal concluded, "Recommended for anyone concerned about expression on the Internet and democratic society." Booklist observed, "He wants us to understand that the principles upon which this country is founded are unquestionably worth the risk. He passionately defends, in clear, one-two-three soundbites, the online freedom he wants his daughter to inherit, and he insists that his readers untangle the meanings behind the use of words such as indecency and pornography to frighten and to confuse." Booklist recommended Cyber Rights be carried in libraries, concluding, "Most libraries will want copies for both circulating and professional collections."

Cyber Rights: Defending Free Speech in the Digital Age received a positive review in Salon, which noted, "Readers of 'Cyber Rights' will range from those who have never heard of Mike Godwin to those who have tangoed with him online at some point or have at least lurked silently as the debate raged. Whatever the number in the first category, those falling into the second are legion. Godwin has been online so long he's had a celebrated law that predicts the course of online discussions named after him." The review observed, "Throughout 'Cyber Rights,' it becomes clear that what makes Godwin a sometimes unpleasant online sparring partner is precisely what has catapulted him to the front lines in the seemingly endless battles for free speech on the Net. ... his tenacity and his insistence on wrestling every last breath out of his opponents' arguments." Salon characterized the book as, "an instructional book with an argument to convey – a sort of cross between a dry, textbookish primer and a lively personal history."

Columbia Journalism Review gave the book a favorable review, noting, "This is a lively, garrulous account by an activist who was deeply involved in turning back the threat of regulation and, at least for the time being, securing rights of free expression online." The review described the latter portion of the book as "a more intense personal chronicle of Godwin's deep involvement in what he calls the 'cyberporn panic' – the push to control Internet content." Columbia Journalism Review concluded, "Ultimately, Godwin shows, this strong response laid the groundwork for lawsuits that enabled the Supreme Court to declare the 'decency' amendment unconstitutional. He was in the thick of things throughout this effort, and his journal lets the reader relive the tension and uncertainty of trying to halt a media stampede before it crushed everything in its path."

School Library Journal recommended the book for young readers, and commented, "Teens growing up with the Net aren't likely to find a better roadmap to the issues affecting their First Amendment future there than this book." The New York Times Book Review was critical of Godwin's writing style in the book, and observed, "He writes in a strong, piercing voice that probably does wonders in a courtroom, but comes off increasingly shrill over several hundred pages of commentary, and at one point fairly warns his reader, 'Subtlety isn't my strong point. The Journal of Information Ethics wrote, "This is less an analytic study than a personal survey of situations or occurrences articulated in an informal, colloquial, and anecdotal fashion. It is not aimed at the intelligentsia or legal profession, although members of these groups would certainly benefit from the details." The review concluded, "The details are sometimes overwhelming, but for those who wish to know everything, this is a good place to start."

The Philadelphia Inquirer highlighted Cyber Rights among "1998's Best Reading", and concluded, "Often reads, as Godwin intends, as a handbook for free-speech activism". A review in the San Antonio Express-News concluded, Cyber Rights' is an extremely important book, one that anyone who accesses the Internet should read. Those who support the causes Godwin fights against aren't going to be happy with it, because he pokes some big holes in their arguments. But one of the bedrock freedoms we all enjoy is freedom of speech, and Godwin makes an elegant defense in its behalf." The Dallas Morning News characterized the book as a multifaceted legal instructive work, and commented, "Part philosophical musings, part legal primer, part history and part political analysis, the book touches on just about every facet of how the Internet is transforming free-speech issues." The Houston Chronicle wrote, "Godwin makes a passionate case for ensuring the online world has the same civil rights as the 'real' world." Writing in the book Internet and the Law, author Aaron Schwabach comments, "The book takes an anticensorship position, but it presents all sides of the various questions fairly and completely."

CommLaw Conspectus of The Catholic University of America noted, "Cyber Rights brims with anecdotes and behind-the-scenes looks at the people and organizations struggling with the [reality] and potential of the information superhighway." A review of the book in The Green Bag concluded, "Overall, Godwin seems to be preaching to the choir, rather than making legal arguments to win over converts. Lower publication costs do increase the possibility of publication, but, standing alone, may not justify replacing the legal regimes developed over time to regulate expression – legal regimes which, for the most part, have endured through previous revolutions in the technology of disseminating information. Theology, which calls on faith, and economics, which calls on reason and empiricism, may not be compatible. But the Internet is about a shift in the economics of expression, not a theological revolution in how the First Amendment affects society, and when the project is getting the legal prescriptions right, all of the implications must be taken seriously."

Publishers Weekly commented that in the book Godwin put forth "an unusually broad view of free speech". The review noted that by citing noteworthy legal cases affecting free speech online, "he frames nicely some of the issues raised by the encounter of the 200-year-old Bill of Rights and the cutting-edge Internet." Publishers Weekly wrote that by the end of the book, "his arguments have become predictable – or flimsy, as when he implies that the Net poses no new risks with its dissemination of dangerous information, such as bomb-making instructions, because libraries have carried such information for years." The review concluded, "Godwin's book is a thoughtful examination of an important subject, but its thoughts seem too often filtered through rose-colored screens."

In a review of the revised and updated 2003 edition of the book, Law Library Journal wrote, "Cyber Rights: Defending Free Speech in the Digital Age is a book that can help the uninitiated become familiar with the issues and arguments that have shaped the debate over regulating cyberspace." The review noted, "Cyber Rights was inspired by Godwin's unwavering belief that an uncensored Internet can transform society into a true democracy. It is an exceptionally personal work and resembles an online journal. ... The book, written in the first person, has a casual and conversational style. As the reader is able to 'hear' the author's voice, Cyber Rights is extremely easy to read." Law Library Journal criticized the book for being repetitive, and for dismissing arguments of his opponents as "an irrational fear of the unknown (i.e., cyberspace) or as a poor understanding of case law or the Framers' intent". The review acknowledged, "Cyber Rights is a good introduction to the world of cyberspace and the legal issues that affect the Internet. It presents, in a readable style, a passionate perspective on an emerging area of law." Law Library Journal recommended the book for "large academic law libraries".

See also

Godwin's law
Books
Code and Other Laws of Cyberspace
The Hacker Crackdown
Internet and Technology Law Desk Reference
The Law of Cyber-Space 
Small Pieces Loosely Joined
Who Controls the Internet?
Law centers
Berkman Center for Internet and Society at Harvard Law School
Norwegian Research Center for Computers and Law
Stanford Center for Internet and Society, at Stanford Law School

References

Further reading
Book reviews

Related

External links
Cyber Rights: About the Author, Panix.com
Cyber Rights, College of Behavioral and Social Sciences, University of Maryland
Cyber Rights, The MIT Press
What Every Citizen Should Know About DRM

1998 non-fiction books
Books about the Internet
Works about computer law
Cyberspace
Books about freedom of speech
Times Books books